Dust Breeding is a Big Finish Productions audio drama based on the long-running British science fiction television series Doctor Who.

The story marks the return of Caroline John to Doctor Who and the introduction of the Master to the Big Finish continuity.

Plot
The Seventh Doctor's diary has a strange entry that the painting "The Scream" by Edvard Munch is going to be destroyed in "mysterious circumstances". So he and Ace visit a colony of artists on the barren dust world of Duchamp 331 to find out more. He isn't expecting the return of one of his most personal enemies...

Cast

Notes
The Master spends the story in a state of decay similar to that shown in The Deadly Assassin and The Keeper of Traken. His alias in the story, Mr. Seta, is, as is typical for the Master, an anagram of Master.
Caroline John previously played the Third Doctor's companion Liz Shaw in the 1970 season. She was married to Geoffrey Beevers, who had previously played the Master in The Keeper of Traken.
Geoffrey Beevers returns to the role in Master.
The character of Bev Tarrant previously appeared in The Genocide Machine and also appears in the Bernice Summerfield audio drama The Bellotron Incident.
The Doctor mentions that there are multiple Mona Lisas in existence, and that the one in the Louvre has "THIS IS A FAKE" written under the paint in felt-tip pen.  This is a reference to events of the Fourth Doctor serial City of Death.
The Doctor reveals to Ace that he has the original of Rembrandt's Night Watch in the TARDIS.  He claims to have rescued it from a museum fire in the Rijksmuseum in the 33rd century.  The TARDIS art gallery also features a Terileptil sculpture.
The name of the planet Duchamp 331 is almost certainly a reference to artist Marcel Duchamp, and Dust Breeding a reference to the Duchamp and Man Ray photograph of the same name.
Ace and the Doctor mention to Bev Tarrant that they have encountered the monstrous alien Krill before, on a colony world.  This is a reference to the events of the Past Doctor Adventures novel Storm Harvest.
The Doctor reverses the polarity of an air conditioning unit, this is a reference to Jon Pertwee's known phrase during his tenure as The Doctor.

External links
Big Finish Productions – Dust Breeding

Seventh Doctor audio plays
2001 audio plays
Dust